List of rivers in Delaware (U.S. state), grouped by type and sorted by name.

Major rivers and creeks (27)
Appoquinimink River
Blackbird Creek
Brandywine Creek
Broad Creek
Broadkill River
Choptank River
Christina River
Delaware River
Hershey Run
Indian River
Leipsic River
Lingo Creek
Little River
Marshyhope Creek
Mill Creek
Mispillion River
Murderkill River
Naamans Creek
Nanticoke River
Pepper Creek
Pocomoke River
Red Clay Creek
St. Jones River
Sassafras River
Shellpot Creek
Simons River
Smyrna River
White Clay Creek

All named streams (437)
Agricultural Ditch, Sussex County
Ake Ditch, Sussex County
Alapocas Run, New Castle County
[[Allabands Mill Stream (Isaac Branch tributary)|Allabands Mill Stream]], Kent County
Alms House Ditch, Sussex County
Almshouse Branch, Kent County
Alston Branch, Kent County
Angle Rod Creek, New Castle County
Appoquinimink River, New Castle County
Army Creek, New Castle County
Arnell Creek, Sussex County
Ash Gut, Kent County
Asketum Branch, Sussex County
Augustine Creek, New Castle County
Back Creek, New Castle County
Bacon Island Creek, Sussex County
Baker Mill Branch, Sussex County
Bald Cypress Branch, Sussex County
Bald Eagle Creek, Sussex County
Barlow Branch, New Castle County
Batson Branch, Sussex County
Beachy Neidig Ditch, Kent County
Bearhole Ditch, Sussex County
Beaver Branch, New Castle County
Beaver Creek, New Castle County
Beaver Dam Branch, Sussex County
Beaver Gut Ditch, Kent County
Beaverdam Creek, Sussex County
Bee Branch, Sussex County
Belltown Run, New Castle County
Bennefield Branch, Kent County
Big Ditch, The, New Castle County
Big Mill Branch, Sussex County
Black Arm Prong, Kent County
Black Savannah Ditch, Sussex County
Black Stallion Ditch, New Castle County
Black Swamp Creek, Kent County
Blackbird Creek, New Castle County
Blackwater Creek, Sussex County
Blackwater Creek, Sussex County
Blanco Ditch, Kent County
Bogy Run, New Castle County
Booth Branch, Kent County
Bowman Branch, Sussex County
Brandywine Creek, New Castle County
Brasures Branch, Sussex County
Bridgeville Branch, Sussex County
Bright Haines Glade Branch, Kent County
Brights Branch, Sussex County
Brittingham Branch, Sussex County
Broad Creek, Sussex County
Broadkill River, Sussex County
Brockonbridge Gut, Kent County
Browns Branch, Kent County
Bucks Branch, Sussex County
Bullock Prong, Kent County
Bundicks Branch, Sussex County
Buntings Branch, Sussex County
Burrows Run, New Castle County
Burrsville Branch, Kent County
Burton Prong, Sussex County
Butler Mill Branch, Sussex County
Cahoon Branch, Kent County
Canary Creek, Sussex County
Carney Run, New Castle County
Cart Branch, Sussex County
Cattail Branch, Kent County
Cedar Creek, New Castle County
Cedar Creek, Sussex County
Chapel Branch, Sussex County
Chapel Branch, Sussex County
Cherry Walk Creek, Sussex County
Chestnut Run, New Castle County
Choptank River, Kent County
Christina River, New Castle County
Church Branch, Sussex County
Clarksville Branch, Sussex County
Clear Brook, Sussex County
Cod Creek, Sussex County
Coffee Run, New Castle County
Cohee Prong, Kent County
Collins Creek, Sussex County
Connelly Mill Branch, Sussex County
Cool Branch, Sussex County
Cooper Branch, Sussex County
Copper Branch, Kent County
Corks Point Ditch, New Castle County
Cow Bridge Branch, Sussex County
Cow Marsh Creek, Kent County
Cowhouse Branch, Sussex County
Crony Pond Branch, Sussex County
Crooked Creek, Sussex County
Crystal Run, New Castle County
Culbreth Marsh Ditch, Kent County
Cypress Branch, Kent County
Cypress Branch, New Castle County
Deep Branch, Sussex County
Deep Branch, Sussex County
Deep Branch, Sussex County
Deep Creek, New Castle County
Deep Creek Sussex County
Deep Hole Branch, Sussex County
Delaware River, New Castle County
Derrickson Ditch, Sussex County
Devious Branch, Kent County
Dirickson Creek, Sussex County
Ditch Creek, Sussex County
Dogwood Branch, New Castle County
Doll Run, New Castle County
Dorman Branch, Sussex County
Doty Glade, Sussex County
Double Fork Branch, Sussex County
Double Run, Kent County
Dragon Creek, New Castle County
Drawyer Creek, New Castle County
Drum Creek, Sussex County
Duck Creek, Kent County
Duck Creek, Kent County
Dukes and Jobs Ditch, Sussex County
Dukes Ditch, Sussex County
Dutton Ditch, Sussex County
Dyke Branch, Kent County
East Branch Christina River, New Castle County
Ebenezer Branch, Sussex County
Eli Walls Ditch, Sussex County
Elliott Pond Branch, Sussex County
Fairfield Run, New Castle County
Fan Branch, Kent County
Finis Branch, Kent County
Fisher Creek, Sussex County
Fishing Branch, Kent County
Fishing Creek, New Castle County
Fivefoot Prong, Kent County
Fork Branch, Kent County
Fork Number One Pepper Creek, Sussex County
Freidel Prong, Sussex County
Gambles Gut, New Castle County
Georgetown-Vaughn Ditch, Sussex County
Gilbert Trivitts Ditch, Sussex County
Gill Branch, Sussex County
Gills Branch, Sussex County
Glade Branch, Sussex County
Gordon Branch, Sussex County
Goslee Creek, Sussex County
Graham Branch, Sussex County
Gravelly Branch, Kent County
Gravelly Branch, Sussex County
Gravelly Ditch, Sussex County
Gravelly Run, Kent County
Grays Branch, Sussex County
Grays Prong, Sussex County
Great Bohemia Creek, New Castle County
Greens Branch, Kent County
Green Briar Branch, Sussex County
Green Creek, Kent County
Green Spring Branch, New Castle County
Greenlees Ditch, Kent County
Green Branch, Kent County
Grubby Neck Branch, Sussex County
Guinea Creek, Sussex County
Gully Camp Ditch, Sussex County 	
Gum Branch, Sussex County
Gum Branch, Sussex County
Gum Branch, Sussex County
Guthrie Branch, New Castle County
Hangmans Run, New Castle County
Harrington Beaverdam Ditch, Kent County
Hawkey Branch, Kent County
Hawks Inlet (historical), Kent County
Heron Drain, Kent County
Herring Branch, Kent County
Herring Branch, New Castle County
Herring Branch, Sussex County
Herring Branch, Sussex County
Herring Creek, Sussex County
Herring Run, New Castle County
Herring Run, Sussex County
Herron Run, Kent County
Hickman Ditch, Kent County
Hill Savannah Ditch, Sussex County
Hitch Pond Branch, Sussex County
Holland Glade, Sussex County
Holly Branch, Sussex County
Hopkins Prong, Kent County
Hopkins Prong,	Sussex County
Horse Pen Branch, Sussex County
Horse Pound Swamp Ditch, Sussex County
Horsepen Arm, Kent County
Horsepen Ditch, Kent County
Houston Branch, Sussex County
Houston-Thorogood Ditch, Sussex County
Hudson Branch, Kent County
Hurley Drain, Sussex County
Hurricane Run, New Castle County
Husbands Run, New Castle County
Hyde Run, New Castle County
Improvement Branch, Kent County
Indian Branch, Kent County
Indian River, Sussex County
Ingram Branch, Kent County
Ingram Branch,	Sussex County
Ingram Branch,	Sussex County
Iron Branch, Sussex County
Iron Mine Branch, Sussex County
Iron Mine Prong, Kent County
Isaac Branch, Kent County
Island Creek, Sussex County
Island Pond Marsh Ditch, Kent County
Isaac Branch, Kent County
Jackson Branch, Sussex County
Jackson Prong,	Kent County
James Branch, Sussex County
Jamison Branch, Kent County
Jobs Ditch, Sussex County
Johnson Branch, Sussex County
Johnson Branch, Sussex County
Jones Branch, Sussex County
Jones Mill Branch, Sussex County
Jordan Branch,	Kent County
Joy Run, New Castle County
Kent-Sussex Line Branch, Kent County
Kings Causeway Branch,	Kent County
Lamborn Run, New Castle County
Layton-Vaughn Ditch, Sussex County
Leathermans Run, New Castle County
Lednum Branch,	Kent County
Lee Joseph Creek, Sussex County
Leipsic River, Kent County
Lewes Creek, Sussex County
Lewis Prong, Sussex County
Lingo Creek, Sussex County
Little Creek, Sussex County
Little Mill Creek, New Castle County
Little River, Kent County
Long Branch, Sussex County
Long Creek, New Castle County
Long Drain Ditch, Sussex County
Lost Stream, New Castle County
Love Creek, Sussex County
Luther Marvel Prong, Kent County
Mahon River, Kent County
Maidstone Branch, Kent County
Maple Branch, Sussex County
Maple Marsh and Beaver Dam Branch, Sussex County
Marshyhope Ditch,	Kent County
Martin Branch,	Sussex County
Massey Branch, New Castle County
Matson Run, New Castle County
Mayer Branch, Sussex County
McColleys Branch, Sussex County
McCrays Branch, Sussex County
McGee Ditch, Sussex County
Meadow Branch, Sussex County
Meredith Branch, Kent County
Middle Run, New Castle County
Mifflin Ditch,	Sussex County
Mill Branch, Sussex County
Mill Creek, Kent County
Mill Creek (White Clay Creek tributary), New Castle County
Mill Creek, New Castle County
Miller Creek, Sussex County
Mirey Branch, Sussex County
Mispillion River, Sussex County
Mockingbird Creek, Sussex County
Mockingbird Creek, Sussex County
Morgan Branch,	Kent County
Morgan Branch,	Sussex County
Morris Branch, New Castle County
Morris Branch,	Sussex County
Muddy Bottom Ditch, Kent County
Muddy Branch, Kent County
Muddy Run, New Castle County
Mullet Run, Kent County
Munchy Branch,	Sussex County
Murderkill River, Kent County
Naamans Creek, New Castle County
Narrow Ditch, Sussex County
New Ditch, Sussex County
Newell Branch,	Kent County
Nonesuch Creek, New Castle County
North Fork Green Run, Sussex County
North Prong, Sussex County
Number One Prong, Sussex County
Number Two Prong, Kent County
Old Baptist Church Branch, Kent County
Old Forge Branch, Sussex County
Old Mill Creek, Sussex County
Old Slaughter Creek, Sussex County
Owens Branch, Sussex County
Owens Branch, Sussex County
Parker and Sampson Ditch, Sussex County
Parker Branch, Sussex County
Parnell Branch, Kent County
Paw Paw Branch, New Castle County
Pemberton Branch, Sussex County
Penrose Branch, Kent County
Pepper Branch, Sussex County
Pepper Creek, Sussex County
Perch Creek, New Castle County
Perkins Run, New Castle County
Persimmon Run, New Castle County
Peterkins Branch, Sussex County
Phillips Branch, Sussex County
Phillips Ditch, Sussex County
Pigeon Run, New Castle County
Pike Creek, New Castle County
Piney Branch, Sussex County
Pinks Branch, Kent County
Pipe Elm Branch, Kent County
Plum Creek, Sussex County
Point Branch, Kent County
Polk Branch, Sussex County
Polly Branch, Sussex County
Pot Hook Creek, Sussex County
Powell Ditch, Kent County
Pratt Branch, Kent County
Presbyterian Branch, Sussex County
Price Prong, Kent County
Primehook Creek, Sussex County
Prong Number One, Sussex County, Delaware
Prong Number Two, Kent County
Prospect Branch, Kent County
Providence Creek, Kent County
Puncheon Run, Kent County
Quarter Branch, Kent County
Raccoon Ditch, Sussex County
Raccoon Prong, Sussex County
Ramsey Run, New Castle County
Red Clay Creek, New Castle County
Red House Branch, Kent County
Red Lion Creek, New Castle County
Rocky Run, New Castle County
Rogers Branch, Sussex County
Ross Prong, Kent County
Rossakatum Branch, Sussex County
Round Pole Branch, Sussex County
Roy Creek, Sussex County
Rum Bridge Branch, Sussex County
Saint Georges Creek, New Castle County
St. Jones River, Kent County
Sandom Branch, New Castle County
Sandtown Branch, Kent County
Sandy Branch, New Castle County
Sandy Branch, Sussex County
Sangston Prong, Kent County
Sarah Run, Sussex County
Saulsbury Creek, Kent County
Saunders Branch, Sussex County
Savannah Ditch, Sussex County
Sawmill Branch, New Castle County
Scott Run, New Castle County
Sewell Branch, Kent County
Sheep Pen Ditch, Sussex County
Shellpot Creek, New Castle County
Shields Prong, Kent County
Shoals Branch, Sussex County
Short and Hall Ditch, Sussex County
Shorts Ditch, Sussex County
Silver Run, New Castle County
Simons River, Kent County
Simpler Branch, Sussex County
Slaughter Creek, Sussex County
Smith-Short and Willin Ditch, Sussex County
Smyrna River, New Castle County
Snows Branch, Kent County
Sockorockets Ditch, Sussex County
South Branch Naamans Creek, New Castle County
Sowbridge Branch, Sussex County
Spring Branch, Kent County
Spring Creek, Kent County
Spruances Branch, Kent County
Stallion Head Branch, Sussex County
Stockley Branch, Sussex County
Stockley Creek, Sussex County
Stoney Branch, Sussex County
Stenkil Creek, New Castle County
Stump Creek, Sussex County
Sunset Branch, Sussex County
Swan Creek, Kent County
Swan Creek, Sussex County
Tantrough Branch, Sussex County
Tanyard Branch, Sussex County
Tappahanna Ditch, Kent County
Taylor Branch, Kent County
Terrapin Pond, Sussex County
Thompson Branch, Sussex County
Thorndyk Branch, Kent County
Tidbury Creek, Kent County
Tidy Island Creek, Kent County
Tom Creek, New Castle County
Tomahawk Branch, Kent County
Toms Dam Branch, Sussex County
Tubbs Branch, Sussex County
Trunk Ditch, Kent County
Tubmill Branch, Kent County
Turkey Branch, Sussex County
Turkey Branch, Sussex County
Turkey Run, New Castle County
Turtle Branch, Sussex County
Tussocky Branch, Sussex County
Tussocky Branch, Sussex County
Twiford Meadow Ditch, Sussex County
Tyndall Branch, Sussex County
Unity Branch, Sussex County
Vena Gains Branch, Sussex County
Vines Creek, Sussex County
Wall Branch, Sussex County
Ward Branch, Kent County
Wards Branch, Sussex County
Warwick Gut, Sussex County
Webber Branch, Kent County
Welsh Branch, Sussex County
West Branch Christina River, New Castle County
West Branch Gum Branch, Sussex County
West Branch Naamans Creek, New Castle County
Whartons Branch, Sussex County
Wheeling Branch, Sussex County
White Clay Creek, New Castle County
White Creek, Sussex County
White Marsh Branch, Kent County
White Marsh Branch, Sussex County
White Oak Creek, Sussex County
White Oak Swamp Ditch, Sussex County
Wildcat Branch, Kent County
Wiley Branch Ditch, Sussex County
William H Newton Ditch, Sussex County
Williams Creek, Sussex County
Willis Branch, Kent County
Willow Grove Prong, Kent County
Willow Run, New Castle County
Wilson Creek, Sussex County
Wilson Run, New Castle County
Wisacco Cipus (historical), New Castle County
Wolfe Glade, Sussex County
Wood Duck Run, New Castle County
Wright Creek, Sussex County

Rivers and streams by watershed

Delaware River and Delaware Bay
Naamans Creek
South Branch Naamans Creek
Perkins Run
Stenkil Creek
Fox Kill
Shellpot Creek
Matson Run
Turkey Run
Christina River
Brandywine Creek
Alapocas Run
Husbands Run
Willow Run
Wilson Run
Rocky Run
Hurricane Run
Carney Run
Ramsey Run
Beaver Creek
Little Mill Creek
Chestnut Run
Willow Run
Nonesuch Creek
White Clay Creek
Hershey Run
Red Clay Creek
Hyde Run
Coffee Run
Burrows Run
Mill Creek
Pike Creek
Middle Run
Bogy Run
Leathermans Run
Belltown Run
Muddy Run
West Branch Christina River
Persimmon Run
East Branch Christina River
Army Creek
Gambles Gut
Tom Creek
Red Lion Creek
Doll Run
Cedar Creek
Dragon Creek
Saint Georges Creek
Scott Run
Joy Run
Crystal Run
Guthrie Branch
Augustine Creek
Silver Run
Appoquinimink River
Skunk Hill Ditch
The Big Ditch
Hangmans Run
Drawyer Creek
Deep Creek
Blackbird Creek
Mill Creek
Fishing Creek
Beaver Branch
Barlow Branch
Sandom Branch
Angle Rod Creek
Smyrna River
Sawmill Branch
Corks Point Ditch
Morris Branch
Mill Creek
Green Spring Branch
Massey Branch
Duck Creek
Greens Branch
Providence Creek
Paw Paw Branch
Taylors Gut
Duck Creek
Quarter Gut
Hawkey Branch
Leipsic River
Raymond Gut
Dyke Branch
Bennefield Branch
Spruances Branch
Snows Branch
Alston Branch
Willis Branch
Taylor Branch
Pinks Branch
Simons River
Herring Branch
Green Creek
Muddy Branch
Mahon River
Old Womans Gut
Little River
Lewis Ditch
Sand Ditch
St. Jones River
Trunk Ditch
Beaver Gut Ditch
Cypress Branch
Tidbury Creek
Newell Branch
Red House Branch
Isaac Branch
Almshouse Branch
Allabands Mill Stream
Puncheon Run
Fork Branch
Murderkill River
Spring Creek
Double Run
Hudson Branch
Pratt Branch
Ash Gut
Browns Branch
Ward Branch
Indian Branch
Spring Branch
Black Swamp Creek
Beaverdam Branch
Fan Branch
Brockonbridge Gut
Mispillion River
Kings Causeway Branch
Fishing Branch
Old Baptist Church Branch
Swan Creek
Tubmill Branch
Deep Branch
Mullet Run
Bowman Branch
Lednum Branch
Johnson Branch
Tantrough Branch
Beaverdam Branch
Cedar Creek
Slaughter Creek
Beaverdam Branch
Church Branch
Broadkill River
Canary Creek
Broadkill Sound
Primehook Creek
North Prong
Sowbridge Branch
Ingram Branch
Old Mill Creek
Fisher Creek
Black Hog Gut
Martin Branch
Crooked Creek
Doty Glade
Beaverdam Creek
Round Pole Branch
Ingram Branch
Dutton Ditch
Savannah Ditch
Pemberton Branch
Brittingham Branch

Atlantic coast bays
Rehoboth Bay
Stockley Creek
Bald Eagle Creek
White Oak Creek
Johnson Branch
Love Creek
Arnell Creek
Cherry Walk Creek
Dorman Branch
Stillman Glade
Hetty Fisher Glade
Goslee Creek
Bundicks Branch
Herring Creek
Wilson Creek
Guinea Creek
Hopkins Prong
Phillips Branch
Unity Branch
Burton Prong
Sarah Run
Chapel Branch
Wall Branch
Lee Joseph Creek
Bacon Island Creek

Indian River Bay
Lingo Creek
Indian River
Emily Gut
Blackwater Creek
Pepper Creek
Vines Creek
Island Creek
Warwick Gut
Swan Creek
Whartons Branch
Iron Branch
Houston-Thorogood Ditch
Wiley Branch
Shoals Branch
Long Drain Ditch
Cow Bridge Branch
Stockley Branch
Alms House Ditch
Horse Pound Swamp Ditch
Gills Branch
Eli Walls Ditch
McGee Ditch
Deep Branch
Peterkins Branch
White Oak Swamp Ditch
Simpler Branch
Welsh Branch
Sockorockets Ditch
Sheep Pen Ditch
Mirey Branch
Narrow Ditch
Pepper Creek
Blackwater Creek
Clarksville Branch
Stump Creek
Vines Creek
Herring Branch
Deep Hole Branch
McCrays Branch
Fork No. 1
Collins Creek
White Creek
Spring Gut
Sloughs Gut

Little Assawoman Bay
Jefferson Creek
Miller Creek
Beaver Dam Ditch
Dirickson Creek
Williams Creek
Agricultural Ditch
Batson Branch
Bearhole Ditch

Assawoman Bay
Roy Creek
Drum Creek

Chesapeake Bay
Elk River (Maryland)
Perch Creek
Bohemia River (MD)
Great Bohemia Creek
Sandy Branch
Back Creek
Long Creek
Guthrie Run
Perch Creek
Sassafras River
Herring Branch
Chester River (MD)
Cypress Branch
Dogwood Branch
Black Stallion Ditch
Andover Branch
Sewell Branch
Blanco Ditch
Jordan Branch
Gravelly Run
Jamison Branch
Muddy Bottom Ditch
Choptank River
Chapel Branch (MD)
Garey Mill Pond Branch
Hopkins Prong
Bullock Prong
Price Prong
Spring Branch
Gravelly Branch
Herron Run
Shields Prong
White Marsh Branch
Greenlees Ditch
Sangston Prong
Sandtown Branch
Cow Marsh Creek
Meredith Branch
Wildcat Branch
Horsepen Ditch
Jackson Prong
Cohee Prong
Iron Mine Prong
Fivefoot Prong
Willow Grove Prong
Cow Marsh Ditch
Herron Drain
Culbreth Marsh Ditch
Luther Marvel Prong
Beachy Neidig Ditch
Ross Prong
Powell Ditch
Ditch Road Ditch
Tidy Island Creek
Tappahanna Ditch
Harrington Beaverdam Ditch
Nanticoke River
Barren Creek (MD)
Mockingbird Creek
Marshyhope Creek
Tanyard Branch
Houston Branch
Brights Branch
Jones Branch
Jones Mill Branch
Iron Mine Branch
Stafford Ditch
Double Fork Branch
Parker and Sampson Ditch
Short and Hall Ditch
Quarter Branch
Saulsbury Creek
Cattail Branch
Green Branch
Tomahawk Branch
Prospect Branch
Point Branch
Bright Haines Glade Branch
Prong No. 2
Beaverdam Branch
Horsepen Arm
Marshyhope Ditch
Black Arm Prong
Plum Creek
Wright Creek
Cod Creek
Owens Branch
Broad Creek
Tussocky Branch
Turkey Branch
Mill Branch
Wheeling Branch
Little Creek
Meadow Branch
Holly Branch
Vena Gains Branch
Cooper Branch
Rossakatum Branch
James Branch
Old Forge Branch
Gordon Branch
Hitch Pond Branch
Pepper Branch
Grays Branch
Thompson Branch
Raccoon Prong
Terrapin Pond
Saunders Branch
Wards Branch
Morris Branch
Figgs Ditch
Elliott Pond Branch
Beaverdam Branch
Miry Branch
Dukes and Jobs Ditch
Tyndall and James Ditch
Turtle Branch
Gum Branch
Lewes Creek
Butler Mill Branch
Horse Pen Branch
Green Briar Branch
Chapel Branch
Morgan Branch
Clear Brook
Herring Run
William Newton Ditch
Bucks Branch
Gilbert Truitts Ditch
Friedel Prong
Swain and Truitt Ditch
Deep Creek
Tubbs Branch
Cool Branch
Graham Branch
Baker Mill Branch
Old Ditch
Black Savannah Ditch
Deep Gully Ditch
Tyndall Branch
Stoney Branch
Asketum Branch
Shorts Ditch
Rum Bridge Branch
McColleys Branch
Layton-Vaughn Ditch
Raccoon Ditch
Mifflin Ditch
Georgetown-Vaughn Ditch
Hurley Drain
Gravelly Branch
Tussocky Branch
Smith-Short and Willin Ditch
Prong Number One
Maple Branch
Maple Marsh and Beaver Dam Branch
Gravelly Ditch
Ake Ditch
Turkey Branch
Gum Branch
Gully Camp Ditch
Toms Dam Branch
Long Branch
Crony Pond Branch
West Branch Gum Branch
Owens Branch
Parkers Branch
Stallion Head Branch
Bridgeville Branch
Polk Branch
Grubby Neck Branch
Bee Branch
Cart Branch
White Marsh Branch
Booth Branch
Kent-Sussex Line Branch
Wicomico River (MD)
North Prong Wicomico River (MD)
Leonard Pond Run (MD)
Connelly Mill Branch
North Prong Leonard Pond Run (MD)
Jackson Branch
Mayer Branch
Pocomoke River
Green Run (MD)
North Fork Green Run
Grays Prong
Gum Branch
Bald Cypress Branch
Lewis Prong
Grays Prong
Tenfoot Ditch
Cypress Farms Ditch
Cowhouse Branch

See also

List of rivers in the United States

References

Delaware rivers
 
Rivers